A tax advisor or tax consultant is a person with advanced training and knowledge of tax law. The services of a tax advisor are usually retained in order to minimize taxation while remaining compliant with the law in complicated financial situations. Tax Advisors are also retained to represent clients before tax authorities and tax courts to resolve tax issues.

Money

Austria
In Austria, Steuerberater is the professional license for tax advisors.

Germany

In Germany, Steuerberater is the professional license for tax advisors.

Italy
In Italy, tax advisors are called commercialisti, and provide assistance on business management, business law, economics, finance, tax, accounting, commercial, corporate and administrative matters. Dottori commercialisti, who have a degree in economics, and ragionieri commercialisti, who have a specific high school diploma, were members of two different professional orders, but they were merged in 2008 into the Ordine dei Dottori Commercialisti e degli Esperti Contabili (Italian for "Professional order of tax advisors"), and it is now impossible to become a commercialista without a laurea magistrale. Esperti contabili, whose roles are similar to those of a commercialista, must have a laurea, a first cycle degree that is equivalent to a bachelor's degree. According to the Italian law, the following activities are some of the roles of a commercialista:
 the administration and liquidation of companies and assets;
 surveys and technical advice;
 inspections and administrative reviews;
 verifications and investigations regarding the reliability of financial statements, accounts and records of a company.

Japan
In Japan, there is a specific license for tax advisors called . In order to obtain this qualification, an individual must pass a special state examination, or already be qualified as an attorney at law or certified public accountant.

South Korea
In South Korea, there is a specific license for tax advisors called certified tax accountant. In order to obtain this qualification, an individual must pass a special examination.

United Kingdom
In the UK, guidelines concerning professional conduct in relation to taxation are published in conjunction with the Chartered Institute of Taxation, the Association of Taxation Technicians, the Institute of Indirect Taxation, the Institute of Chartered Accountants in England and Wales, the Institute of Chartered Accountants of Scotland, the Society of trust and estate practitioners (STEP) and the Association of Chartered Certified Accountants. These were prepared for the assistance of members of the various associations both generally in dealing with clients and the tax authorities and specifically in relation to irregularities and errors.

The guidelines, which include practical advice about a range of legal and ethical issues, are summarised as:

 A member's primary duty is to ensure that his actions comply with the law. He/she owes a contractual duty to the client to act for him/her with the requisite degree of skill and care, and the contractual relationship should be governed by a letter of engagement. The member also has duties to the tax authorities, notably of compliance with the law and the honest presentation of his client's circumstances.
 It is the taxpayer's responsibility to ensure that returns made to the tax authorities are correct and complete. It is for the member to assist him to decide on the extent and manner of disclosure of facts in relation to his tax affairs.
Where a member becomes aware that irregularities have occurred in relation to a client's tax affairs he should advise the client of the consequences, and the manner of disclosure. If necessary, appropriate specialist advice should be taken.
 Where a client refuses to follow the advice of a member in relation to issues involving disclosure, the member should consider whether he should continue to act. If appropriate, specialist advice should be taken.
 If mistakes are made by the tax authorities there may be a need, and in some cases a duty, on the part of the client and sometimes the member, to put matters right.
 Members may have statutory duties of disclosure where they have suspicions of criminal activity.
 When approached for information on a client's affairs by another adviser the member should ensure that he has his client's authority before making any disclosure.

United States
In the United States, paid tax return preparers are regulated but not licensed by the Internal Revenue Service of the United States Department of the Treasury. There are penalties for failure to disclose the identity of the preparer on the return, for the failure to give the taxpayer a copy of the return, and for negligence in preparing the return.

Practice before the Internal Revenue Service is regulated by Treasury Department Circular No. 230, Regulations Governing the Practice of Attorneys, Certified Public Accountants, Enrolled Agents, Enrolled Actuaries, and Appraisers before the Internal Revenue Service. Most practice is limited to attorneys, Certified Public Accountants (CPAs), enrolled agents, and enrolled actuaries. Rendering tax advice is also regulated by Circular 230.

Failure to uphold these standards can result in disciplinary action ranging from reprimand to permanent disbarment from practice.

In the United States, the term "tax professional" is a generic term describing a variety of professions including enrolled agents, Certified Public Accountants (CPAs), financial planners, accountants, tax preparers, and some lawyers.

In the United States, by far the largest segment of tax professionals are individual tax preparers.
31 U.S.C. § 330
5 U.S.C. § 500.

See also 
Tax avoidance
Tax evasion
Taxation in Germany
Worshipful Company of Tax Advisers

References

External links
 AICPA - American Institute of Certified Public Accountants
 ATT - Association of Taxation Technicians (UK)
 CIOT - Chartered Institute of Taxation (UK)
 ITI - Irish Tax Institute (IE)
 Salvatore Virzi Commercialista - Salvatore Virzì Commercialista condivide le sue intuizioni imprenditoriali per i giovani

Consulting occupations
Tax occupations
Legal professions